Cracker is an American crime drama series based upon the British television crime drama of the same name created by Jimmy McGovern. 
It stars Robert Pastorelli as criminal psychologist Gerry 'Fitz' Fitzgerald and includes a young Josh Hartnett in his first professional role, appearing in several episodes playing Fitz's eldest child. Robbie Coltrane, the star of the original series, appears as a villain in one episode.

An "innovative but disturbing" take on the standard police-detective genre, the Americanized Cracker consists of sixteen one-hour episodes set in Los Angeles and was produced by Granada Entertainment. It ran on ABC from September 18, 1997, until January 24, 1998. The remade show was broadcast as Fitz in some countries, including the UK.

Overview
Gerry "Fitz" Fitzgerald is an unconventional but brilliant psychologist, an insulting, nosy, loathsome individual. To be able to pay the bills, he gives lectures at colleges, has a small practice in a mini-mall, and has his own radio show. He also helps the Los Angeles Police Department solve difficult cases, thanks mostly to his own quirks and perversity. These give him an uncanny ability to get inside the criminal mind. But that is only true when he does not have to deal with his own inner demons, which include drinking, gambling, extramarital affairs, and a tense relationship with his wife Judith and his 17-year-old son Michael.

Cast and characters

Main
 Robert Pastorelli as Gerry 'Fitz' Fitzgerald
 Angela Featherstone as Detective Hannah Tyler
 Carolyn McCormick as Judith Fitzgerald
 Robert Wisdom as Detective Danny Watlington
 Josh Hartnett as Michael Fitzgerald
 R. Lee Ermey as Lieutenant Fry

Recurring
 Scott Sowers as Detective Allen Parker
 Paul Perri as Waldron
 Sally Levi (as Sally Livingstone) as Hope Fitzgerald
 Josh Lucas as Lieutenant Macy

Special guest appearances
Robbie Coltrane as David Roberge
Mariska Hargitay as Detective Penny Hatfield
Sarah Paulson as Janice
John DiMaggio as Simon
Lorraine Toussaint as Tisha Watlington
Adewale Akinnuoye-Agbaje as John Doe
Peter Sarsgaard as Spencer Trent
Lee Tergesen as Dan Green
Carlos Jacott as Jim
Amber Benson as Amy

Production
Alternate titles considered for the series were Cracker: Mind Over Murder and Fitz.

Episodes

References

External links
 

1997 American television series debuts
1998 American television series endings
1990s American crime drama television series
American television series based on British television series
Television shows set in Los Angeles
American Broadcasting Company original programming
English-language television shows
Television series by The Kushner-Locke Company
Fictional portrayals of the Los Angeles Police Department